Moyu may refer to:

Moyu Gan ki chhoti company bhi hai
Konjac, a kind of plant
Moyu County, Hotan Prefecture, Xinjiang, China
Moyu, a speedcube brand